Winter, Fifth Avenue is a black and white photograph taken by Alfred Stieglitz in 1893. The photograph was made at the corner of the Fifth Avenue and the 35th Street in New York. It was one of the first pictures that Stieglitz took using a more practical hand camera after his return from Europe.

History and description
Stieglitz later wrote that this photograph was the result of a three-hour wait in a rather inclement snow storm: “In order to obtain pictures by means of the hand camera it is well to choose your subject, regardless of figures, and carefully study the lines and lighting. After having determined upon these watch the passing figures and await the moment in which everything is in balance; that is, satisfies your eye. This often means hours of patient waiting. My picture, ‘Fifth Avenue, Winter,’ is the result of a three hours’ stand during a fierce snow-storm on February 22d, 1893, awaiting the proper moment. My patience was duly rewarded. Of course, the result contained an element of chance, as I might have stood there for hours without succeeding in getting the desired picture."

The picture depicts a carriage driving through a snowy urban landscape. The effect of the snow blurring gives the picture an impressionistic atmosphere. The picture was later wrongly dated by the author as having been taken on 22 February 1892, but it only could have been made the following year, on 22 February 1893, judging by the weather descriptions of both days.

Public collections
There are prints of the picture at the National Gallery of Art, Washington, D.C., the Metropolitan Museum of Art, New York, the Museum of Modern Art, New York, The Minneapolis Institute of Arts, among other collections.

References

1893 works
1893 in art
Black-and-white photographs
1890s photographs
Photographs by Alfred Stieglitz
Collections of the National Gallery of Art
Photographs of the Metropolitan Museum of Art
Photographs of the Museum of Modern Art (New York City)